Approximately Infinite Universe is a double album by Yoko Ono, released in early 1973 on Apple Records. It represents a departure from the experimental avant garde rock of her first two albums towards a more conventional pop/rock sound, while also dabbling in feminist rock. It peaked at number 193 in the United States. The 1997 CD reissue on Rykodisc added two acoustic demos of songs from this era, that were later released on 1981's Season of Glass. It was released again by Rykodisc in 2007.

The album was recorded at The Record Plant in New York City, except for the basic tracks for "Catman" and "Winter Song", which were taped at Butterfly Studios. Ono produced the album with John Lennon, whose participation marked a rare music-related activity for him after the failure of the couple's politically themed 1972 double album Some Time in New York City. Lennon also sang the final verse of the song, "I Want My Love to Rest Tonight." As on the latter album, Ono used the New York band Elephant's Memory as her backing musicians. Mick Jagger dropped into the studio for some of the sessions. He recalled playing guitar very loudly with Lennon.  Jagger also said that Ono "was really trying to sing properly.  She's not screaming, she's really trying to sing."

The inside gatefold sleeve contained Ono's essay "The Feminization of Society". An abridged version of this essay was previously published in The New York Times in February 1972. The full essay was published in Sundance Magazine in May 1972.

Track listing
All songs written by Yoko Ono.

Original release
Side one
 "Yang Yang" – 3:52
 "Death of Samantha" – 6:23
 "I Want My Love to Rest Tonight" – 5:11
 "What Did I Do!" – 4:11
 "Have You Seen a Horizon Lately?" – 1:55

Side two
"Approximately Infinite Universe" – 3:19
 "Peter the Dealer" – 4:43
 "Song for John" – 2:02
 "Catman (The Rosies Are Coming)" – 5:29
 "What a Bastard the World Is" – 4:33
 "Waiting for the Sunrise" – 2:32

Side three
 "I Felt Like Smashing My Face in a Clear Glass Window" – 4:09
 "Winter Song" – 3:37
 "Kite Song" – 3:19
 "" – 2:41
 "Shiranakatta (I Didn't Know)" – 3:13
 "Air Talk" – 3:21

Side four
"I Have a Woman Inside My Soul" – 5:31
 "Move on Fast" – 3:40
 "Now or Never" – 4:57
 "Is Winter Here to Stay?" – 4:27
 "Looking Over from My Hotel Window" – 3:30

CD reissue
Tracks 1–22 per sides one to four of the original album, with the following bonus tracks on disc two:

"Dogtown" (acoustic demo) – 2:51
 "She Gets Down on Her Knees" (acoustic demo) – 2:45

"She Gets Down on Her Knees" (acoustic demo) is not present on the 2017 reissue

Personnel
Yoko Ono – vocals, piano on "Looking Over from My Hotel Window" and "She Gets Down on Her Knees", arrangements
Joel Nohnn (anagram of John Lennon) – guitar, backing vocals
Stan Bronstein – saxophone, flute, clarinet
Rick Frank – drums, percussion
Daria Price – castanets
Gary Van Scyoc – bass guitar, trumpet
Adam Ippolito – piano, Hammond organ, harmonium, trumpet
Wayne "Tex" Gabriel – guitar
Mick Jagger - guitar on "Is Winter Here to Stay?"

Production credits
Produced by Yoko Ono and John Lennon
Arrangement – Yoko Ono
String orchestration – Ron Frangipane
Chief engineer – Jack Douglas
Assistant engineer – Danny Turbeville
Butterfly Studio engineer – Kurt Munkacsi
Re-release produced by Yoko Ono and Rob Stevens (1997)
Remastered by George Marino and Rob Stevens, Sterling Sound, New York City (1997)
Bettina Rossner, John Lennon, Yoko Ono - artwork
Bob Gruen, Iain MacMillan - photography

Charts

Release history

In popular culture
The post-punk rock band Death of Samantha, founded in 1983, named themselves after the song of that name on this album.

Notes

References

Yoko Ono albums
1973 albums
Apple Records albums
Rykodisc albums
Albums produced by John Lennon
Plastic Ono Band albums